Marianne Löfgren (24 February 1910 – 4 September 1957) was a Swedish actress. She played in Åke Ohberg's Elvira Madigan (1943), director Ingmar Bergman's debut Crisis in 1946, Hasse Ekman's Girl with Hyacinths (1950) and in over a hundred other films in her native Sweden.

Selected filmography

 The Dangerous Game (1933)
 What Do Men Know? (1933)
 Man's Way with Women (1934)
 The Lady Becomes a Maid (1936)
 Styrman Karlssons flammor (1938)
 The Great Love (1938)
 Landstormens lilla Lotta (1939)
 Only One Night (1939)
 Nothing But the Truth (1939)
 With Open Arms (1940)
 The Poor Millionaire (1941)
 Only a Woman (1941)
 Fransson the Terrible (1941)
 The Talk of the Town (1941)
 Man glömmer ingenting (1942)
 Dangerous Ways (1942)
 The Case of Ingegerd Bremssen (1942)
 Nothing Is Forgotten (1942)
 Elvira Madigan (1943)
 Kungsgatan (1943)
 Mister Collins' Adventure (1943)
 She Thought It Was Him (1943)
 Som du vill ha mej (1943)
 I Killed (1943)
 A Girl for Me (1943)
 Imprisoned Women (1943)
 Little Napoleon (1943)
 I Am Fire and Air (1944)
 The Emperor of Portugallia (1944)
 Vandring med månen (1945)
 The Rose of Tistelön (1945)
 Motherhood (1945)
 Crisis (1946)
 While the Door Was Locked (1946)
 Affairs of a Model (1946)
 Incorrigible (1946)
 The Balloon (1946)
 Two Women (1947)
 The Loveliest Thing on Earth (1947)
 Dynamite (1947)
 A Swedish Tiger (1948)
 Sunshine (1948)
 Life at Forsbyholm Manor (1948)
 Prison (1949)
 Woman in White (1949)
 The Street (1949)
 Girl with Hyacinths (1950)
 Knockout at the Breakfast Club (1950)
 Fiancée for Hire (1950)
 The Kiss on the Cruise (1950)
 The Quartet That Split Up (1950)
 Perhaps a Gentleman (1950)
 Divorced (1951)
 My Name Is Puck (1951)
 Customs Officer Bom (1951) 
 Defiance (1952)
 Salka Valka (1954)
 Time of Desire (1954)
 Simon the Sinner (1954)
 Young Summer (1954)
 Whoops! (1955)
 Egen ingång (1956)
 Girls Without Rooms (1956)
 Night Child (1956)

References

Further reading

External links

1910 births
1957 deaths
Burials at Norra begravningsplatsen
20th-century Swedish actresses